Topolog may refer to the following features in Romania:
Topolog (Danube), a tributary of the Danube in Tulcea and Constanța Counties 
Topolog (Olt), a tributary of the Olt in Argeș and Vâlcea Counties
Topolog, Tulcea, a commune in Tulcea County
Topolog Viaduct, a railway viaduct in Vâlcea County